Israel competed at the 1996 Summer Olympics in Atlanta, United States. 25 competitors, 18 men and 7 women, took part in 26 events in 10 sports. Gal Fridman won a bronze medal in Sailing, the only medal won by an Israeli at these games.

Medalists

Bronze
 Gal Fridman — Sailing, Men's Mistral Individual Competition

Results by event

Athletics

Boxing

Canoeing

Fencing

Judo

Sailing

Shooting

Swimming

Weightlifting

Wrestling

References

External links
Official Olympic Reports
International Olympic Committee results database

Nations at the 1996 Summer Olympics
1996 Summer Olympics
Summer Olympics